Although organized crime has always existed in Sweden, it has risen in the 2000s and the number of organized criminal groups operating in the country is increasing. In 2018 the country had the highest gun deaths in total in Europe; deaths involving guns tripled in Sweden between 2012 and 2020.

Background 

Since the 2000 street gangs in this predominantly immigrant suburbs of large cities get in the business of organized crime. Intensified shootings and even bombings, mostly in predominantly immigrant suburbs of large cities. Eight in 10 shootings in Sweden happened in a “criminal environment” mostly in disadvantaged neighborhoods, according to the Swedish National Council for Crime Prevention (2022). When the gangs made more money, the disputes between gangs got bigger.

History 
Deaths involving guns tripled in between 2012 and 2020.

In 2021 the popular Swedish teen rapper Einar was shot several times and killed in a suburb of Stockholm. Sweden’s then National Police Commissioner Anders Thornberg told the Financial Times the rising gang violence in Sweden could potentially be a “threat” to its democracy if “certain groups” continue to “stand outside” of society, referring to immigrants in disadvantaged neighborhoods.

Known criminal organizations

Outlaw motorcycle gangs 
Outlaw motorcycle groups such as the Hells Angels and Bandidos are well-established in Sweden. Their membership is increasing and they are reportedly active in organized criminal activities.

Other criminal organizations 
 Brödraskapet - A Swedish prison gang active in organised crime. Their members are mostly native Swedes.
 Södertäljenätverket - An Assyrian/Syriac mafia organisation.
 Naserligan - An Albanian criminal organisation. Newly formed alliance/syndicate between Yugoslavians and Ethnic Swedes.
 Black Cobra - An organised criminal gang originally from Denmark. It expanded to Sweden where it was started in Rosengård. In Sweden it mostly consists of Iraqis and Iranians.
 K-Falangen- An Albanian criminal organisation based in Malmö.
 M-Falangen - A criminal organisation based in Malmö and composed of ethnic Sandžak Bosniaks. They are involved in a wide variety of criminal activities and are said to be very violent and brutal.
 Chosen Ones - A multicultural criminal organisation based in Stockholm. Led by the Gambia-born Essa Sallah Kah, it is affiliated with the Hells Angels. Most members are in prison.
 Werewolf Legion - A criminal organisation based in Stockholm. Led by Rolando Teran de la Torre, it mostly consists of immigrants from Africa and South America who were born in the 1980s. They are involved in robbery and extortion.
 Asir - Criminal organisation which consists of hardened criminals from Uppsala, Norrköping, Västerås and Göteborg. It mostly consists of Assyrians/Syriacs from Turkey and Iraqis. Leader is Süyar Gürbüz an ethnic Assyrian/Syriac from Turkey.
 Bredäng Warriors - A criminal organisation that is specialised in doing coarse robbery.
Uppsalamaffian - Criminal group from Uppsala mostly consisting of ethnic Swedes, modeled after the Italian Mafia, involved in cocaine trafficking, loan sharking and extortion. Leader Stefan Eriksson later cofounded the controversial video game company Tiger Telematics, which produced the Gizmondo hand-held console.

See also

Crime in Sweden
List of grenade attacks in Sweden
Bombings in Sweden

References

Further reading
 Webbplatsen svenskmaffia.se